The void ratio of a mixture is the ratio of the volume of voids to volume of solids.

It is a dimensionless quantity in materials science, and is closely related to porosity as follows:

and

where  is void ratio,  is porosity, VV is the volume of void-space (such as fluids), VS is the volume of solids, and VT is the total or bulk volume. This figure is relevant in composites, in mining (particular with regard to the properties of tailings), and in soil science. In geotechnical engineering, it is considered one of the state variables of soils and represented by the symbol e.

Note that in geotechnical engineering, the symbol  usually represents the angle of shearing resistance, a shear strength (soil) parameter. Because of this, the equation is usually rewritten using  for porosity:

and

where  is void ratio,  is porosity, VV is the volume of void-space (air and water), VS is the volume of solids, and VT is the total or bulk volume.

Engineering applications

 Volume change tendency control. If void ratio is high (loose soils) voids in a soil skeleton tend to minimize under loading - adjacent particles contract. The opposite situation, i.e. when void ratio is relatively small (dense soils), indicates that the volume of the soil is vulnerable to increase under loading - particles dilate.
 Fluid conductivity control (ability of water movement through the soil). Loose soils show high conductivity, while dense soils are not so permeable.
 Particles movement. In a loose soil particles can move quite easily, whereas in a dense one finer particles cannot pass through the voids, which leads to clogging.

See also
Void (composites)

External links
Relation between void ratio and porosity

References 

Materials science
Soil mechanics
Earth sciences
Soil science
Mining terminology